August Peet (25 April 1881, Pati Parish – unknown)was an Estonian lawyer and politician. Between 1918 and 1919, he was Minister of Internal Affairs.

Peet arrested by the NKVD on 19 July 1940 in Tallinn. On 8 March 1941, he was sentenced to 8 years in prison. His fate afterwards is unknown.

References

1881 births
20th-century Estonian lawyers
Year of death missing
Government ministers of Estonia
Estonian people who died in Soviet detention
People who died in the Gulag
Estonian prisoners and detainees
People from Saarde Parish